Musa Rajekshah (born 1 April 1974), also known as Ijeck, is an Indonesian entrepreneur and politician from the Golkar party who became the Vice Governor of North Sumatra since 5 September 2018.

References 

1974 births
People from Medan
Vice Governors of North Sumatra
Indonesian people of Indian descent
Indonesian politicians of Indian descent
Indonesian people of Pakistani descent
Golkar politicians
Living people